The 2003 Tippmix Budapest Grand Prix was a women's tennis tournament played on outdoor clay courts in Budapest, Hungary that was part of the Tier V category of the 2003 WTA Tour. It was the ninth edition of the tournament and was held from 14 April until 20 April 2003. Second-seeded Magüi Serna won the singles title and earned $16,000 first-prize money.

Finals

Singles

 Magüi Serna defeated  Alicia Molik 3–6, 7–5, 6–4
 It was Serna's 2nd singles title of the year and the 3rd of her career.

Doubles

 Petra Mandula /  Elena Tatarkova defeated  Conchita Martínez Granados /  Tatiana Perebiynis 6–3, 6–1

External links
 ITF tournament edition details
 Tournament draws

Colortex Budapest Grand Prix
Budapest Grand Prix
Buda
Buda